The Prince Edward Viaduct System, commonly referred to as the Bloor Viaduct, is the name of a truss arch bridge system in Toronto, Ontario, Canada, connecting Bloor Street East, on the west side of the system, with Danforth Avenue on the east. The system includes the Rosedale Valley phase (a smaller structure, referred to as the Rosedale Valley Bridge, carrying Bloor Street over the Rosedale Ravine) and the Sherbourne Phase, an embankment built to extend Bloor Street East to the Rosedale Ravine from  Sherbourne Street. The Don Valley phase of the system, the most recognizable, spans the Don River Valley, crossing over (from west to east) the Bayview Avenue Extension, the Don River, and the Don Valley Parkway.

The roadway has five lanes (three eastbound and two westbound) with a bicycle lane in each direction. The subway level connects Broadview Station in the east with Castle Frank and Sherbourne Stations to the west.

Design

Designed by Edmund W. Burke, the Prince Edward Viaduct is a three hinged concrete-steel arch bridge with a total span of 494 metres  (1,620 feet), at 40 metres (131 feet) above the Don Valley. The bridge consists of a deck made of transverse beams and I-girders, which transfer load to column supports. The column supports then transfer the load to the trusses within the arches, which transfer the load to the arches themselves. Finally, the arches transfer their load through large hinges to a concrete pier and eventually to the ground. Steel was provided by Dominion Bridge Company.

In addition to the Don River, the Don Valley Parkway, and Bayview Avenue, two railway lines, an electrical transmission line and a bicycle trail all pass under the bridge spans.

History

Referendums on the construction of the Prince Edward Viaduct were held in Toronto in every year from 1910 to 1913, with residents voting against its construction in 1912 by 59 votes and in favour in 1913 by 9236 votes. Upon its completion in 1918, it was named for Prince Edward, Prince of Wales (later King Edward VIII).

The viaduct was designed to facilitate mass transit; its upper deck accommodated streetcars, while both the Don Valley phase and the Rosedale Valley phase included a lower deck for rail transport, controversial at the time because of its high additional cost. The bridge's designer and the commissioner of public works, R.C. Harris, were able to have their way and the lower deck eventually proved to save millions of dollars when the Toronto Transit Commission's Bloor–Danforth subway opened in 1966. The Rosedale Valley phase was not used for the subway, as the curve between each phase, as well as the curve to the west at Parliament Street, was considered too sharp for the subway. For this reason, a separate concrete bridge was built over the Rosedale Valley, just west of Castle Frank station.

The Prince Edward Viaduct resulted in more rapid development of those portions of Toronto lying on the east side of the Don Valley.

Luminous Veil
Over time, the Prince Edward Viaduct became a magnet for suicide, falling bodies posing risk to the traffic underneath. With nearly 500 suicides by 2003, the viaduct ranked as the most fatal standing structure in Canada and the second most in North America, after the Golden Gate Bridge in San Francisco. At its peak in 1997, the suicide rate averaged one person every 22 days. In 1957, a child also climbed onto the railing and fell accidentally while walking along it but survived.

The suicides and safety risks prompted the construction of a barrier in 2003, though it was first approved by Toronto City Council in 1998 and delayed because of concerns about funding; during that time, the viaduct was the site of an estimated 48 to 60 suicides. The council originally approved a  budget. Council eventually endorsed a fundraising campaign to raise the remainder of the money.

The barrier was called the Luminous Veil. The tensile structure was difficult to analyze and required several tests at the University of Toronto. Initially, cost prohibited the planned lighting to be installed on the top horizontal member. The lighting installation was completed in July 2015. The Luminous Veil received in 1999 a Canadian Architect Award of Excellence.

A 2010 study found that though the barrier prevented suicide attempts from the viaduct, overall rates of suicide by jumping for the City of Toronto have not changed since its construction. However, a 2017 study with the same lead author found that "over the long term, suicide-by-jumping declined in Toronto after the barrier with no associated increase in suicide by other means". During construction of the barrier in 2002, a man opted to jump off from the Leaside Bridge and others have opted to jump in front of subway trains instead.

References in popular culture

In film
 Saint Monica
 Resident Evil: Apocalypse
 Room

In literature, plays, and publications
(Alphabetical by author)
 In Gabriel's Kitchen
 In the Skin of a Lion
 Flashforward

In music
 "War on Drugs" by the Barenaked Ladies
 "Anything Could Happen" by Bruce Cockburn
 "National Hum" by The Constantines
 "Romantic Traffic" by Spoons

In television
 Degrassi Junior High episode titled "Dog Days"
"Murdoch Mysteries: S15 Ep10 - Drawn in Blood

See also
 Royal eponyms in Canada
 Suicide bridge
 List of bridges in Canada

References

External links

Railway bridges in Ontario
Bridges completed in 1918
Bridges completed in 1966
Bridges in Toronto
Don River (Ontario)
Double-decker bridges
Road-rail bridges in Canada
Viaducts in Canada
Truss arch bridges
Concrete bridges in Canada
Road bridges in Ontario
Public art in Toronto
Suicide prevention